The Spokane Braves are a Junior "B" Ice Hockey team based in Spokane, Washington, United States. They are members of the Neil Murdoch Division of the Kootenay Conference of the Kootenay International Junior Hockey League (KIJHL). They play their home games at Eagles Ice-A-Rena. The Braves are the only team in the KIJHL to play in the United States. They were forced to go on hiatus at the beginning of the 20/21 season due to the US/Canada border closure.

History

Despite their long history in the KIJHL, the Braves have never won the league championship. They won their division in 1978/79, 1983/84, and the 1991/92 season. The Spokane Braves primary focus is to move players up to the next level such as the WHL, Junior A, and College Hockey.

The club was founded as the Spokane Rockets in 1972, finally becoming the Braves in 1985.

The WHL Spokane Chiefs drafted their first player from the Braves in the bantam draft in 2003.

Mike Bay coached the team for 13 years in the 2000s and 2010s, and returned as coach in 2018.

Season-by-season record

Note: GP = Games played, W = Wins, L = Losses, T = Ties, OTL = Overtime Losses, SOL = Shootout Losses, D = Defaults, Pts = Points, GF = Goals for, GA = Goals against

Records as of March 29, 2020.

 Notes

 Stats for the 1990-91 season are only thru February 17, 1991. May not be complete

Playoffs

Records as of March 29, 2020.

 Notes

 Prior to the 2001-02 KIJHL playoffs, there was only three playoff rounds (Division Semifinals, Division Finals and Finals), due to two Divisions (Eddie Mountain/West and Neil Murdoch/East) only.

NHL alumni

Dennis LaRue
 Sean Zimmerman
Derek Ryan
Scott Levins
 Mike McGeough
Scott Parker

KIJHL Awards and trophies

Top Defenceman
Brian Piper: 1987-88
Bobby Tobiason: 1991-92
Chase Wharton: 2009-10
Skyler Smutek: 2007-08
Kyle Davis: 2013-14
Taylor Everhart: 2015-16

Rookie of the Year
Jesse Collins: 2009-10
Skyler Smutek: 2007-08
Jason Greenwell: 2004-05
Jon Manlow: 2013-14
Mason Jones: 2015-16

Most Valuable Player
Evan Witt: 2006-07
Justin Bonanno: 2013-14
Kurtis Redding: 2015-16

Top Scorer
Evan Witt: 2005-06
Kurtis Redding: 2015-16

KIJHL AWARDS
Chase Wharton: 2009-10 Neil Murdoch Division Top Defenseman
Jesse Collins: 2009-10 Neil Murdoch Rookie of the Year
Brycen Fisher: 2012-13 Neil Murdoch Division Top Defenseman
Jon Manlow: 2013-14 Neil Murdoch Division Goalie of the Year
Gary Redding: 2013-14 Neil Murdoch Division Coach of the Year
Trevor DiLauro: 2015-16 Neil Murdoch Division Goalie of the Year
Luke Gallagher: 2016-17 Neil Murdoch Division Rookie of The Year
Gary Redding: 2017-18 Neil Murdoch Division Coach of The Year
Bear Hughes: 2018-19 Neil Murdoch Division Top Scorer
Bear Hughes: 2018-19 Neil Murdoch Division MVP
Bear Hughes: 2018-19 Neil Murdoch Division Rookie of the Year
Bear Hughes: 2018-19 KIJHL Rookie of The Year
Matt Klenk: 2019-20 Neil Murdoch Most Sportsmanlike Player of the Year

References

External links
Official website

Sports in Spokane, Washington
Ice hockey teams in Washington (state)
1971 establishments in Washington (state)
Ice hockey clubs established in 1971